Major James Rose, 23rd Baron of Kilravock (1820-1909) was a British Army officer serving in British India, the Lord Lieutenant of Nairn and the Chief of Clan Rose. The third surviving son of Hugh Rose, 20th of Kilravock by his second wife, Catherine Mackintosh of Farr.

Early life
Born into a strongly political family, to Hugh Rose, 20th of Kilravock and his second wife, Catherine Mackintosh of Farr. The Roses were active in Highland politics, his father was Member of Parliament for Nairnshire, his great-grandfather was Member of Parliament for Ross-shire and his great-great-grandfather was one of the Scottish representatives to the first Parliament of Great Britain also for Nairnshire and also became a Lord Lieutenant but of Ross-shire. He was also the grandson of the literary critic and author Elizabeth Rose, Lady of Kilravock. Rose was educated in Edinburgh and followed that by joining Addiscombe Military Seminary and subsequently joined the British Indian Army.

Career
As the youngest son of his father, following his father's death in 1827, Rose joined the British Army in India following his training at Addiscombe Military Seminary. During his time in the Army he rose to the rank of Major. Following the death of his elder brother, John Baillie Rose, 22nd of Kilravock on 20 September 1854, Rose inherited Kilravock Castle and the title Baron of Kilravock at which point he returned to Scotland from the army. On his return he was appointed Justice of the Peace and Deputy Lieutenant of the County of Nairn. In 1889 he was then appointed Lord Lieutenant of Nairn a position in which he served until 1903.

Personal life
Rose married, firstly, Anna Maria Twemlow, daughter of General George Twemlow and Anna Maria Hannah D'Oyly, daughter of Edward D'Oyly  (a descendant of the D'Oyly baronets), on 15 January 1850, they had four children.
Catherine Isabella Ellen Rose (2 May 1859 - 28 December 1945), married Rev. Arthur Frederick Pope, had issue.
Lt Col Hugh Rose, 24th of Kilravock  (10 August 1863 - 22 February 1946), he married Ruth Antoinette Guillemard, daughter of Walter George Guillemard. 
Captain John Rose (11 January 1866 - 24 October 1896), died unmarried. 
Elizabeth Margaret Rose  (died 19 March 1933), married Ronald Hugh Baillie , son of Lieutenant-General Duncan Baillie , had issue. 

He married, secondly, Eliza, widow of Parr W. Hocking, they had three children. Rose died on 30 March 1909 at his home, Kilravock Castle, aged 89.

References

External links
Who's Who page

1820 births
1909 deaths
Graduates of Addiscombe Military Seminary
British Army officers
British East India Company Army officers
British East India Company Army generals
Lord-Lieutenants of Nairn
Scottish justices of the peace
Scottish landowners
Clan Rose